China State Bank was a bank in China.

History 
1928: Established in Shanghai with its Chinese name of 國華銀行.
1938: Set up Hong Kong branches.
1948: Change its Chinese name to 國華商業銀行.
1980: Moved its headquarters to Beijing.
1989: Became a wholly owned subsidiary of Bank of China Group.
2001: Merged to form Bank of China (Hong Kong).

References

Banks based in Shanghai
Companies based in Beijing
Bank of China
Defunct banks of China
Banks disestablished in 2001
Banks established in 1928
Chinese companies established in 1928